Bangaru Thalli is a welfare scheme for girls launched by Government of Andhra Pradesh. The scheme supports the family of a girl from her birth till her graduation. All the Below Poverty Line white card holders are eligible for the scheme.

History
It was launched on 1 May 2013 by Chief Minister of Andhra Pradesh, Kiran Kumar Reddy. The supporting legislation AP Bangaru Thali Girl Child Promotion and Empowerment Act, 2013 was passed on 19 June 2013 in Andhra Pradesh Legislative Assembly.

The Scheme
The state government will give Rs 1,000 every month to every pregnant woman the moment she conceives till she delivers a baby. If she gives birth to 
- a baby girl born Rs 2,500 

- Rs 1,500 every year through Anganwadis till the girl turns 5 years.

- At the time of admission to school, Rs 1,000

- Rs 2,000 will be given every year for her studies from the first to the fifth standard

- Rs 2,500 from sixth to  eighth standard

- Rs 3,000 for ninth and tenth standard

- Rs 3,500 each year for Intermediate

- Rs 3,000 a year during her graduation.

OBJECTIVES OF BANGARU TALLI

  To show unflinching support to the girl child

  Incentivise all-round growth of the girl children

  Improve the social status of the Girls/women

  To reset the feeling that girl child is a burden

  Help fight the social evils faced by women

  Prevent Gender discrimination by empowering & protecting the right of the Girl children &

  Restore demographic balance.

  Achieve Millennium Development Goals

  Channelize capabilities of women for nation building

  Assure continuity of the scheme

  Define responsibilities of all functionaries

 

SCOPE

  All girl children born in economically backward households

  Born on or after 1 May 2013

  Possessing White ration card

 

ENTITLEMENTS ASSURED

   PUBLIC HEALTH FACILITIES for safe institutional deliveries

    PRE & POST-NATAL HEALTH, IMMUNISATION services

    3 YEARS  PRE-SCHOOL education in the Anganwadi  

    8 YEARS PRIMARY education

    2 YEARS of HIGH SCHOOL education 

    2 YEARS of education AFTER THE 10TH standard and

    3/4 YEARS of COLLEGE EDUCATION

    SKILL TRAINING for suitable employment.

 

INCENTIVES
  Financial incentives on achieving the milestones as enclosed.

  In addition to any subsidy and incentive already provided.

  After 21 years:

a)   If Intermediate completed & studies discontinued a pay out of Rs.50,000

b)  If Degree completed, a payout of Rs.1 lakh

  Identification through the Aadhaar Number and biometrics.

  Direct electronic deposit in the account without any intermediaries.

  Disbursement after biometric authentication

IMPLEMENTATION STRUCTURE
  State Council under the Chairmanship of Chief Minister

  Ministers and Secretaries of all relevant Departments.

  Women & Child Welfare Department is the Nodal Authority

  State level implementing Authorities: SERP – Rural areas &

MEPMA – Urban areas

 

IMPLEMENTATION PROCESS

IT driven

Central Electronic Registry and an online database

Separate authorities for updation & authentication.

ANM to register pregnant woman

AWW reports birth

VO uploads into central database

VO will monitor the child till schooling

Colleges upload using online by the colleges

 

 
SOCIAL AUDIT

  All data in public domain for transparency.

  All expenditure to be put to social audit

 
BUDGETARY REQUIREMENTS
ASSUMPTIONS:

   16 lakh new births, 8 lakhs are girls.

   Gross Enrolment Ratio of girls in intermediate is 40%. This will improve to 50%.

   20% of girls reach graduation now. This will improve to 30% (Plan goal by 2020)

   Budgetary Inflows & therefore Plan budgets will register a growth of 10% every year.

FUNDS REQUIRED

      Considering births of 8 lakh girl children every year, the payout:

      In the 1st year would be Rs. 200 Cr and

      Gradually increase to Rs.6,618 Cr by end of 2034-35

References

Government welfare schemes in Andhra Pradesh
https://web.archive.org/web/20140816055822/http://www.allapplicationforms.com/AP-bangarutalli-scheme.html